Cattleya iricolor is a species of orchid native to the eastern montane forests of Ecuador and Peru.

Description 
Cattleya iricolor is an epiphytic orchid with slightly compressed pseudobulbs with a single terminal leaf each. The leaves are narrow, up to 35 cm long and 3 cm wide. Flowers are very fragrant, creamy white or yellowish, 8 cm across in size, with long and narrow petals and sepals, pointy lip; up to 6 flowers per pseudobulb.

Distribution and habitat 
Cattleya iricolor grows in Peru and Ecuador in montane forests of the eastern Andes at elevations of ca.1000 m.

Conservation 
The conservation status of Cattleya iricolor is assessed as vulnerable since 1997 by the IUCN.

References

External links

iricolor
Flora of Ecuador
Flora of Peru